The Tonga-Kermadec Ridge is an oceanic ridge in the south-west Pacific Ocean underlying the Tonga-Kermadec island arc.
It is the most linear, fastest converging, and most seismically active subduction boundary on Earth, and consequently has the highest density of submarine volcanoes.

The Pacific Plate subducts westward beneath the Australian Plate along the ridge. It is divided into two segments, the northern Tonga Ridge and southern Kermadec Ridge, by the Louisville Seamount Chain. On its western side, the ridge is flanked by two back-arc basins, the Lau Basin and Havre Trough, that began opening at 6  and 2 Ma respectively. Together with these younger basins the ridge forms the eastward-migrating, 100 Ma-old Lau-Tonga-Havre-Kermadec arc/back-arc system or complex.

The extension in the Lau-Havre basin results in a higher rate of subduction than convergence along the Australian-Pacific plate boundary. As a result, the Tonga-Kermadec Ridge moves independently of both tectonic plates and forms the Tonga-Kermadec Plate, in its turn fragmented into the Niuafo'ou, Tonga, and Kermadec microplates.

The Samoa and Louisville mantle plumes both contribute to the lavas of two of the northern Tonga islands, Tafahi and Niuatoputapu; ocean island basalt (OIB) from the Samoa plume were introduced from 3–4 Ma when subduction in the Vitiaz Trench (north-west of Tonga) ceased. The lavas of the Louisville Seamount Chain were generated 80–90 Ma but began to subduct under the Tonga-Kermadec Ridge at  8 Ma.

The Hikurangi and Manihiki plateaux, north and south of the Tonga-Kermadec Ridge respectively, form part of the Ontong Java-Hikurangi-Manihiki large igneous province (LIP), the largest volcanic event on Earth during the past 200 million years. The Osbourn Trough, located just north of the Tonga-Kermadec and Louisville intersection, is the palaeo-spreading centre between the Hikurangi and Manihiki plateaux away from which the age of the Pacific Plate increases from  85 Ma to 144 Ma.
The subduction of the Hikurangi Plateau beneath New Zealand and the southern part of the Kermadec Arc has resulted in large volumes of lava and a high density of volcanoes in the arc.  The initial Hikurangi-Kermadec collision, however, occurred  to the north where a missing piece of the Ontong Java-Hikurangi-Manihiki LIP has already been subducted.

See also
 Taupo Volcanic Zone

References
 Notes

 Sources

 
 
 
 
 
 

Underwater ridges of the Pacific Ocean
Geography of the New Zealand seabed
Subduction zones